Danggali Wilderness Protection Area is a protected area located about  north of Renmark in South Australia.  The wilderness protection area was proclaimed under the Wilderness Protection Act 1992 on 28 May 2009 on land excised from the Danggali Conservation Park .  It is classified as an IUCN Category Ib protected area.

See also
 Protected areas of South Australia
 Danggali, South Australia
 Riverland Biosphere Reserve

References

External links
Danggali Conservation Park and Wilderness Protection Area official webpage
Danggali Wilderness Protection Area  webpage on protected planet

Wilderness areas of South Australia
Protected areas established in 2009
2009 establishments in Australia